Thunderchild 115C is an Indian reserve of the Thunderchild First Nation in Saskatchewan. In the 2016 Canadian Census, it recorded a population of 34 living in 14 of its 16 total private dwellings.

References

Indian reserves in Saskatchewan
Division No. 17, Saskatchewan